Harry Kane  (born Henry Kohn) (born July 27, 1876 – died in Portland, Oregon, September 15, 1932) was a professional baseball player. He played from 1902 to 1906. He was nicknamed Klondike.

Kane was Jewish, and was born in Hamburg, Arkansas.

References

External links

1870s births
1932 deaths
Baseball players from Arkansas
Charleston Sea Gulls players
Denver Grizzlies (baseball) players
Detroit Tigers players
Hugo Hugoites players
Jewish American baseball managers
Jewish American baseball players
Jewish Major League Baseball players
Knoxville Appalachians players
Major League Baseball pitchers
Minor league baseball managers
People from Hamburg, Arkansas
Philadelphia Phillies players
Rochester Bronchos players
Savannah Indians players
Savannah Pathfinders players
Springfield Midgets players
St. Louis Browns players
Wichita Falls Drillers players
Williamsport Millionaires players
Wilmington Peaches players